Sadistic personality disorder was a personality disorder defined by a pervasive pattern of sadistic and cruel behavior. People with this disorder were thought to have desired to control others. It was believed they accomplish this through the use of physical or emotional violence. This diagnosis appeared in an appendix of the Diagnostic and Statistical Manual of Mental Disorders (DSM-III-R). The later versions of the DSM (DSM-IV, DSM-IV-TR, and DSM-5) do not include it. It was removed as psychiatrists believed it would be used to legally excuse sadistic behavior.

Symptoms and behaviors 
Sadistic personality disorder was defined by a pervasive pattern egosyntonic of sadistic behavior. Individuals possessing sadistic personalities tend to display recurrent aggression and cruel behavior. People with this disorder will use violence and aggression in an attempt to control and dominate others. When others refuse to submit to their will, they will increase the level of violence they use. Many sadists will verbally and emotionally abuse others rather than physically, purposefully manipulating others through the use of fear or shaming and humiliating others. Some people with this disorder will not abuse others, but will instead display a preoccupation with violence. This disorder was thought to be caused by childhood trauma or being raised in by a family where one spouse is abused. Sadistic personality disorder was considered more common in men than women.

Comorbidity with other personality disorders 
Sadistic personality disorder was thought to have been frequently comorbid with other personality disorders, primarily other types of psychopathological disorders. In contrast, sadism has also been found in patients who do not display any or other forms of psychopathic disorders. Conduct disorder in childhood, and Alcohol use disorder were thought to have been frequently comorbid with Sadistic personality disorder. Researchers had difficulty distinguishing sadistic personality disorder from the other personality disorders due to its high levels of comorbidity with other disorders.

Diagnostic criteria 
According to the DSM-III-R diagnostic criteria Sadistic personality disorder is defined by a pervasive pattern of sadistic and cruel behavior that begins in early adulthood. It was defined by four of the following.

 Has used physical cruelty or violence for the purpose of establishing dominance in a relationship (not merely to achieve some noninterpersonal goal, such as striking someone in order to rob him/her).
 Humiliates or demeans people in the presence of others.
 Has treated or disciplined someone under his/her control unusually harshly.
 Is amused by, or takes pleasure in, the psychological or physical suffering of others (including animals).
 Has lied for the purpose of harming or inflicting pain on others (not merely to achieve some other goal).
 Gets other people to do what he/she wants by frightening them (through intimidation or even terror).
 Restricts the autonomy of people with whom he or she has a close relationship, e.g., will not let spouse leave the house unaccompanied or permit teenage daughter to attend social functions.
 Is fascinated by violence, weapons, injury, or torture.

This behavior must not be better explained by sexual sadism disorder and it must be directed towards more than one person.

Differential diagnosis

Millon's subtypes 
Theodore Millon claimed there were four subtypes of sadism, which he termed enforcing sadism, explosive sadism, spineless sadism, and tyrannical sadism.

History
Sadistic personality disorder was developed as forensic psychiatrists had noticed many patients with sadistic behavior. It was introduced to the DSM in 1987 and it was placed in the DSM-III-R as a way to facilitate further systematic clinical study and research. It was removed from the DSM for numerous reasons. Sadistic personality disorder also shared a high rate of comorbidity with other disorders, implying that it was not a distinct disorder on its own. Millon writes that "Physically abusive, sadistic personalities are most often male, and it was felt that any such diagnosis might have the paradoxical effect of legally excusing cruel behavior." Researchers were also concerned about the stigmatizing nature of the disorder, and that it put patients at higher risk of abuse from prison guards. Theorists like Theodore Millon wanted to generate further study on SPD, and so proposed it to the DSM-IV Personality Disorder Work Group, who rejected it.

Sub-clinical sadism in personality psychology 

There is renewed interest in studying sadism as a personality trait. Sadism joins with subclinical psychopathy, narcissism, and Machiavellianism to form the so-called "dark tetrad" of personality.

See also 
 Antisocial personality disorder, a personality disorder characterized by a long term pattern of disregard for, or violation of, the rights of others
 Bullying
 Evil Genes
 Malignant narcissism
 Psychopathy
 Sadism and masochism
 Schadenfreude
 Self-defeating personality disorder (masochistic personality disorder)
 Sexual sadism disorder
 Zoosadism

References

Blaney, P. H., Millon, T. (2009). Oxford Textbook of Psychopathology. New York: Oxford University Press.
Davis, R., Millon, T. (2000). Personality Disorders in Modern Life. Canada: John Wiley & Sons, Inc. 
Livesley, J. (1995). The DSM-IV Personality Disorders. New York, NY: Guilford Press.
Million, T. (1996). Disorders of Personality DSM-IV and Beyond. New York: Wiley-Interscience Publication.

Pacana, G. (2011, March 2). Sadists and sadistic personality disorder.

External links 

 "Provisional Psychological Profile of Washington, D.C.-Area Sniper" provides some theoretical descriptions of the sadistic personality, which, in addition to being a "white man", were traits concluded by the author to describe the D.C. sniper attacks shooter.

Criminology
Forensic psychology
Violence
Obsolete terms for mental disorders